Duke of Groove is a 1995 American short film directed by Griffin Dunne. It was nominated for Academy Award for Best Live Action Short Film.

Cast
 Tobey Maguire as Rich Cooper
 Kate Capshaw as Rebecka
 Kiefer Sutherland as The Host
 Uma Thurman as Maya

Soundtrack
American rock band Swell also appears in the film and contribute to the music.

Accolades
Academy Award for Best Live Action Short Film

Home media
This film was one of four on a DVD released in Australia by the MRA Entertainment Group as Perverse Destiny, Vol 3

See also 
Counterculture of the 1960s
1995 in film
The Ice Storm - a 1997 film also featuring Tobey Maguire similar in content

References

External links

MUBI
Vimeo

1995 films
1995 short films
American independent films
American short films
Films set in the 1970s
Films directed by Griffin Dunne
1990s English-language films
1990s American films